New Nationalism may refer to:
New Nationalism (Theodore Roosevelt), a Progressive political philosophy during the 1912 U.S. presidential election
New Nationalism (21st century), a type of nationalism that rose in the mid-2010s especially in Western Europe and the United States
German new nationalism